Yilida headquartered in Taizhou, Zhejiang, China is a world-wide supplier of fans, motors and accessories to the HVAC industry. Yilida is listed on Shenzhen Stock Exchange, in China since July 2, 2012.

History
Yilida was founded in 1994 in Taizhou, Zhejiang province.

Locations
Yilida has manufacturing facilities in Taizhou, Guangzhou, Tianjin, and sales offices over 30 cities in China.

Markets
Yilida's products are used in Fan Coil Units, Air Handling Units, Building Ventilations, and Metro and tunnel ventilations.

Recent Acquisition
 In December 2012, Yilida announced the acquisition of Fulihua, an axial fan company located in Suzhou, China.
 In August 2014,  Yilida announced the acquisition of the majority shareholding of Zhejiang MaEr Fan Co., Ltd. a fan company that specializes in the external rotor motor fans.

With both acquisitions, Yilida expanded its product lines to cover internal rotor and external rotor axial fans for the HVAC industry.

References

External links
Yilida., Website
Fulihua., Website
The Part Center

Manufacturing companies established in 1994
Companies based in Zhejiang
Companies listed on the Shenzhen Stock Exchange
Heating, ventilation, and air conditioning companies
Chinese brands
Chinese companies established in 1994